John Charles Preston Besford, OBE (30 January 1911 – 26 February 1993) was an English competitive swimmer who represented Great Britain in the Olympics and European championships, and England in the British Empire games, during the 1930s.  Besford competed primarily in the backstroke.

He was born in Chorlton-cum-Hardy, Lancashire, England. and died in Spain.

Besford was European 100-metre backstroke champion in 1934. He won the bronze medal for England at the 1930 British Empire Games and silver at the 1934 British Empire Games in London, both in the 100-yard backstroke event.  In 1934 he was also a member of the English team which won the bronze medal in the medley relay contest.  Besford also competed in the 1928 Summer Olympics where he finished sixth in the 100-metre backstroke.  Eight years later he was eliminated in the semi-finals of the 100-metre backstroke.

He studied dentistry at The University of Manchester, and after serving as an officer in World War II, he taught dentistry at the University of Beijing, China.  He later spent time in Yokohama, Japan, before returning to the UK to operate a dental practice in Brighton.  He was appointed to the Order of the British Empire (OBE) in the 1975 New Year's Honours List for services to the British community of Tokyo.

See also
 List of Commonwealth Games medallists in swimming (men)

References and notes

External links
 
 

1911 births
1993 deaths
Alumni of the University of Manchester
Commonwealth Games bronze medallists for England
Commonwealth Games silver medallists for England
English male swimmers
European Aquatics Championships medalists in swimming
Male backstroke swimmers
Olympic swimmers of Great Britain
People from Chorlton-cum-Hardy
Swimmers at the 1928 Summer Olympics
Swimmers at the 1930 British Empire Games
Swimmers at the 1934 British Empire Games
Swimmers at the 1936 Summer Olympics
Commonwealth Games medallists in swimming
Officers of the Order of the British Empire
Medallists at the 1930 British Empire Games
Medallists at the 1934 British Empire Games